A list of films produced in Brazil in 1982:

See also
1982 in Brazil
1982 in Brazilian television

References

External links
Brazilian films of 1982 at the Internet Movie Database

Brazil
1982
Films